Three Bagatelles, for David Tudor, better known by its original French title Trois bagatelles, is a 1961 solo piano composition by Hungarian composer György Ligeti. The composition is well known for its tacet sections.

Composition 

Ligeti finished the bagatelles in 1961, as part of his collaboration with neo-dadaist group Fluxus. The original manuscript is kept in Basel, in the Sacher Stiftung, as part of the Nordwall Collection, and is indeed dedicated to David Tudor.

Analysis 

The three bagatelles should take around a minute to perform and should not be performed from memory, as a copy of the score is necessary for performance. The tempo indications are as follows:

 1. ♪ = 40–48
 2. L'istesso tempo
 3. Più lento

The composition consists exclusively of one long C♯1 whole note played in the first bagatelle. Following that, the breaks between the pieces are marked by the turning of each page (one page is left blank between the first bagatelle and the second bagatelle). The piece ends when the pianist stands up and bows towards the audience. It has a certain humorous purpose. The second, tacet, bagatelle, is marked "Molto espressivo". Moreover, the score also includes a fourth bagatelle as an encore of the piece to be performed if the pianist wishes, which is marked "Tempo primo" and only includes a sixteenth rest.

Reception 

This composition was poorly received by the public. In a public performance of the piece by Karl-Erin Welin in Stockholm, the audience was very disappointed, as they were expecting something different. Ligeti, who was not present, stated that he was very satisfied with the reaction. John Cage, composer of 4' 33'', is said to have been deeply offended by this friendly jibe.

See also 

 List of compositions by György Ligeti
 List of solo piano compositions by György Ligeti
 List of silent musical compositions

References

External links 
 A preview of the score
 A performance of the composition in Valencia, Spain

Compositions by György Ligeti
Compositions for solo piano
1961 compositions
Neo-Dada
Contemporary classical compositions